Ardbeg (Scottish Gaelic: An Àird Bheag) is a small settlement on southern coast of the island of Islay off the west coast of Scotland.

Ardbeg is the site of the Ardbeg distillery which was established in 1815 and produces malt whisky. The village grew up around the distillery and by 1900 was home to over 40 distillery workers and had a village school with over 100 pupils. By the end of the 1920s the decline in the village was "noticeable".

The name Ardbeg is an anglicisation of the Scottish Gaelic An Àird Bheag, meaning The Small Promontory.

References

External links

Villages in Islay